KTRS-FM (104.7 MHz) is a Top 40 (CHR) radio station in Casper, Wyoming branded as 104.7 Kiss FM owned by Townsquare Media. As with a majority of FM stations from Casper, the broadcast tower is located south of town on Casper Mountain.

Station history
KTRS was formerly on 95.5 FM. At sign on the station was owned by a company known as Wyomedia. The construction permit for the station dates to September 16, 1977. That frequency lasted from its sign-on date in 1981 until  1997. When it was on 95.5 in the early to mid 1980s, the station aired a variety Top 40 format that played everything from Diana Ross to Pat Benatar and Journey. For a time, it was simply branded 95-5 KTRS.

After being sold to Clear Channel by Mountain States Broadcasting in the late 1990s, the station moved to 104.7 FM. For a short time after the sale, the station used the call letters KYOD. This was prior to the FCC granting a transfer of the KTRS call letters from its location at 95.5 FM. Today, KTRS is known as KISS FM and the playlist is Top 40 that ranges from Electronic Dance Music to Rap/Hip Hop and Pop Rock. KTRS was formerly owned by Clear Channel Communications. KTRS and its sister stations were then sold to Gap West Broadcasting in the late 2000s, which became Townsquare Media in 2011.

KTRS features local news from its sister station KTWO (AM). The station also airs, "Report to Wyoming", a public affairs program. Weather forecasts for the station are provided by Cheyenne-based Day Weather.

References

External links

Official Website
 Flash Stream, MP3 Stream
 

TRS-FM
Radio stations established in 1981
Contemporary hit radio stations in the United States
Townsquare Media radio stations